Desplechin is a French surname. Notable people with the surname include:

Arnaud Desplechin (born 1960), French film director and screenwriter
Édouard Desplechin (1802–1871), French scenic designer
Marie Desplechin (born 1959), French writer

French-language surnames